Children of the Corn is a 2020 American supernatural slasher film written and directed by Kurt Wimmer. It stars Elena Kampouris, Kate Moyer, Callan Mulvey and Bruce Spence. The film is a reimagining of the series and is the eleventh installment of the Children of the Corn series.

Children of the Corn was released in an 18 day theatrical window starting on March 3, 2023 by RLJE Films and will be released on Shudder on March 21, 2023. It will also be released on Blu-ray and DVD on May 9, 2023. It is the first film in the series to be theatrically released since Children of the Corn II: The Final Sacrifice (1993).

Synopsis
A psychopathic twelve-year-old girl in a small town in Nebraska recruits all the other children and goes on a bloody rampage, killing the corrupt adults and anyone else who opposes her. A bright high schooler who won't go along with the plan is the town's only hope of survival.

Cast
 Elena Kampouris as Boleyn Williams
 Kate Moyer as Eden Edwards
 Callan Mulvey as Robert Williams
 Bruce Spence as Pastor Penny
 Stephen Hunter as Calvin Colvington
 Erika Heynatz as June Willis
 Anna Samson as Sheila Boyce
 Sisi Stringer as Tanika
 Andrew S. Gilbert as Sheriff Gebler
 Joe Klocek as Calder Colvington
 Orlando Schwerdt as Cam Colvington
 Brian Meegan as Wilfred Pitt
 Mike Duncan as Walter Pratt
 Trey Daniels as Fred Bein

Production
In 2020, the project was announced to be a remake of Children of the Corn. Producer Lucas Foster later elaborated that it was going to be a new adaptation to King's story with "almost nothing to do with" the 1984 film.  

Principal photography began in New South Wales in early March 2020, at the beginning of the COVID-19 pandemic, and wrapped that June.  The visual effects were produced by Digital Domain, who also executive produced.

Release
Children of the Corn premiered in Sarasota, Florida on October 23, 2020. In January 2023, RLJE Films and streaming service Shudder acquired distribution rights. The film was released in an 18-day theatrical window starting on March 3, 2023 and will be released on Shudder on March 21, 2023. It will also be released on Blu-ray and DVD on May 9, 2023.

Reception

The film received negative reviews from critics.

See also
 List of adaptations of works by Stephen King

References

External links
 

2020 films
2020 horror films
2020s slasher films
2020s American films
American slasher films
American supernatural horror films
Children of the Corn
Films about religion
Films based on works by Stephen King
Films directed by Kurt Wimmer
Films set in Nebraska
Films shot in New South Wales
Folk horror films
Religious horror films
2020s supernatural horror films
Films impacted by the COVID-19 pandemic
2020s English-language films
RLJE Films
Shudder (streaming service) original programming